Colin From Accounts is an Australian comedy series created and written by husband-and-wife team Patrick Brammall and Harriet Dyer, who also star as the show’s main characters. It is produced by CBS Studios for Foxtel, and is currently streaming on Binge.

The series is Binge's second original production after Love Me and premiered on Binge and Foxtel services on 1 December 2022, with all eight episodes being released simultaneously.

Cast
 Harriet Dyer as Ashley
 Patrick Brammall as Gordon
 Emma Harvie as Megan
 Helen Thomson as Lynelle
 Genevieve Hegney as Chiara
 Michael Logo as Brett
 Tai Hara as James

Premise
Set in Sydney, Australia and centred on Ashley (Harriet Dyer) and Gordon (Patrick Brammall), two singles who are brought together by a car accident and an injured dog. Ashley and Gordon are flawed, funny people who choose each other after being brave enough to show their true selves, scars and all, as they navigate life together. It's a modern-day romantic love story.

Episodes

Production
Colin From Accounts is a CBS Studios production in association with Easy Tiger Productions for the FOXTEL Group with production in Sydney, Australia commencing in February 2022.

Reception

Kylie Northover of The Sydney Morning Herald gave the show 4-stars stating "Yes, that's right: it's a romcom. But Australian romcom offerings, particularly on television, are something of a rarity, so to see one executed well, and with particular emphasis on the 'com', is a genuine treat."
Film and TV critic Luke Buckmaster from Guardian Australia also gave the series 4-stars, praising the writing efforts of co-stars Harriet Dyer
and Patrick Brammall: "Here we're in good hands, with Dyer creating the show and co-writing it with Brammall, the pair developing their roles from the inside out – creating personalities that slowly reveal layers, nuances and virtues in ways that feel genuine and germane to the narrative."

References

External links
 
 
 

2022 Australian television series debuts
2020s Australian comedy television series
Australian comedy television series
English-language television shows
Television series by CBS Studios